Zaz-e Sharqi Rural District is a rural district (dehestan) in Zaz va Mahru District, Aligudarz County, Lorestan Province, Iran. At the 2006 census, its population was 7,169, in 1,246 families.  The rural district has 62 villages.

References 

Rural Districts of Lorestan Province
Aligudarz County